The 1999 Wolverhampton Metropolitan Borough Council election took place on 6 May 1999 to elect members of Wolverhampton Metropolitan Borough Council in the West Midlands, England. One third of the council was up for election and the Labour party kept overall control of the council. Overall turnout in the election was 30.63%.

After the election, the composition of the council was
Labour 39
Conservative 17
Liberal Democrat 3

Election results
The results saw Labour keep its majority on the council but lose four seats to other parties. The Conservatives gained seats in Bushbury, Merry Hill and Park wards, while the Liberal Democrats gained in Spring Vale.

Ward results

References

1999
1999 English local elections
1990s in the West Midlands (county)